Kana-Boon (stylized as KANA-BOON) is a Japanese rock band formed in 2008. They made their major debut with Ki/oon Music in 2013. Ever since, they've had four albums reach the top ten on the weekly Oricon Albums Chart, with Doppel being their best-charting album, reaching the third place on the chart. They have also had five singles reach the top ten on the weekly Oricon Singles Chart, with  being their best-charting single, reaching the sixth place on the chart. Three of their singles have been used in the Naruto franchise, with "Silhouette" being used as the 16th Naruto Shippuden opening theme, and "Diver" as the theme song for Boruto: Naruto the Movie and Baton Road as the first season opening for Boruto: Naruto Next Generations. The B-side for "Diver", "Spiral", was the theme song for Naruto Shippuden: Ultimate Ninja Storm 4 video game. This group also made a single for the anime The Perfect Insider titled "Talking". Their single "Fighter" was chosen to be the fourth opening of Mobile Suit Gundam: Iron-Blooded Orphans. Shortly after that, their new single titled "Baton Road" was chosen to be the first opening of the Naruto sequel, Boruto: Naruto Next Generations. Recently, their song "Starmarker" was used as the second opening of the fourth season of My Hero Academia, while their song "Torch of Liberty" was used as the second opening of the second season of Fire Force.

History

2006–2013: Origins and early history
The group was initially formed in 2006 as part of Osaka Prefectural Izumisougou Senior High School's light music club in Sakai, Osaka, and officially formed as a band in 2008. Maguro Taniguchi initially invited Takahiro Koizumi to join the club, and later invited Hayato Koga and Yuuma Meshida. The band's name derives from popular internet slang. The band began performing live at the Mikunigaoka Fuzz live house in Osaka from 2010. During August to September 2011, bassist Hiroaki Hirose left the band, with Yuuma Meshida replacing Hirose. In December 2011, the band won the eo Music Try special prize award.

In April 2012, Kana-Boon won the Ki/oon 20 Years Audition out of 4000 contestants, and served as the opening act for Asian Kung-Fu Generation. On April 13, 2013, the band released their first music video, "Naimononedari", directed by Shinta Yamagishi, and announced their first nationally distributed work, for release on April 24, 2013 through their management Hip Land Music. The album performed successfully, placing 14th on the Oricon Charts.

2013–present: Major label debut
On August 5, 2013, the band announced it had signed with onto the major label Ki/oon Music, and announced their first major label single, and their first major label album, Doppel. The first song for the album, "1.2. step to you", was used in commercials for Docomo's dHits service in April 2014. On February 26, 2014, the band released their second single , a re-recording of their 2011 independently-released song of the same name. On May 21, 2014, the band released their third single, becoming the band's best performing single, placing 6th on the Oricon Charts. On August 27, 2014, the band released their fourth single . On September 8, 2014, Weekly Shōnen Jump revealed that Kana-Boon's fifth single, would be used as the sixteenth opening theme for the anime series Naruto: Shippuden, and was released on November 26, 2014. On December 11, 2014, the band announced that they would be releasing their second album, Time, on January 21, 2015.

On March 23, 2015, it was revealed that their sixth single, would be used in commercials for Shiseido's Anessa cosmetics, and would be released on May 13, 2015. On June 15, 2015, it was announced that the band's seventh single, would be used as the theme song for the anime film Boruto: Naruto the Movie, and on June 29, 2015, it was announced the B-side track, would be used as the theme song for the video game Naruto Shippuden: Ultimate Ninja Storm 4. "Diver" was released on August 5, 2015. On September 3, 2015, it was announced that the band would be performing the opening theme song for the anime series The Perfect Insider titled "talking". "talking" was a rearrangement of the band's independently-released single  from 2013. The song was released as a split single with Scenarioart, who performed the ending theme song for the series, on November 11, 2015. They released the albums Origin in 2016, Namida in 2017, and Honey & Darling in 2022.

Band members

Current members
 Maguro Taniguchi — lead vocals, rhythm guitar (2008–present)
 Hayato Koga — lead guitar, backing vocals (2008–present)
 Takahiro Koizumi — drums (2008–present)
 Masami Endō — bass guitar (2022–present)

Former members
 Hiroaki Hirose — bass guitar (2008–2011)
 Yuuma Meshida — bass guitar (2011–2019)

Discography

Studio albums

Extended plays

Best albums

Singles

Promotional singles

Independent singles

Covers

Music videos

Official music videos

Awards and nominations

References

External links
 Official website (Ki/oon Music)
 Official website (Hip Land Music Corporation)
 
 Kana-Boon discography on iTunes

Japanese rock music groups
Japanese alternative rock groups
Musical groups established in 2008
Musical groups from Osaka Prefecture
Musical trios
Ki/oon Music artists